Jex-Blake is a surname. Notable people with the surname include:
Arthur John Jex-Blake (1873–1957), British physician
Henrietta Jex-Blake (1862–1953), British violinist
Katharine Jex-Blake (1860–1951), British classicist
Sophia Jex-Blake (1840–1912), British physician, teacher and feminist
Thomas Jex-Blake (1832–1915), British Anglican priest and educationalist

See also
Jex
Blake (surname)

Compound surnames
English-language surnames
Surnames of English origin